The 1987 BC Lions finished in first place in the West Division with a 12–6 record. They appeared in the West Final.

Offseason

CFL Draft

Preseason

Regular season

Season standings

Season schedule

Awards and records
CFL's Most Outstanding Defensive Player Award – Greg Stumon (DE)

1987 CFL All-Stars
WR – Jim Sandusky, CFL All-Star
DE – Greg Stumon, CFL All-Star
LB – Kevin Konar, CFL All-Star
DB – Larry Crawford, CFL All-Star

Playoffs

West Final

References

BC Lions seasons
1987 Canadian Football League season by team
1987 in British Columbia